Ain Qinia     is a  local authority in  the  Hasbaya District in Lebanon.

History
In 1838, during the Ottoman era, Eli Smith noted the  population of the place (which he called 'Ain Tinta), as being Druze. 

In 1875 Victor Guérin noted about A'in Kenia: "On October 12, at six o'clock in the morning, I cross the Wadi Hasbeya, which crosses from east to west the village of this name, and I climb to the east-northeast, then to the east, well-cultivated slopes, where the vine prospers wonderfully at a height that exceeds 8oo meters above the Mediterranean.
At six hours and thirty minutes, I reach A'in Kenia, a village inhabited by Druses and schismatic Greeks. We observe the debris of an ancient tower of defense in gigantic blocks. An excellent spring flows in this place, and it is it which, by means of a conduit, feeds water to the castle of Hasbeya."

References

Bibliography

External links
Ain Qinia, Localiban

Populated places in Hasbaya District
Druze communities in Lebanon